The Andrew Newman House is a historic house in Cambridge, Massachusetts. It is a -story wood-frame structure, five bays wide, with a central chimney and an entrance sheltered by an enclosed vestibule. Built in 1823, this single story wood-frame house is one of the oldest houses in the Cambridgeport area of the city. The house is also unusual for its construction date, since it is a Georgian style Cape house, as opposed to the then-prevalent Federal style. Its first owner was a ropemaker.

The house was listed on the National Register of Historic Places in 1982.

See also
National Register of Historic Places listings in Cambridge, Massachusetts

References

Houses completed in 1823
Houses on the National Register of Historic Places in Cambridge, Massachusetts
Georgian architecture in Massachusetts